Rear-Admiral Robert “Bob” Yanow   was a Royal Canadian Navy senior officer who served as Commander of Maritime Forces Pacific from 1984 to 1987.

Yanow was born in Saskatoon, was a Sea Cadet and graduated from Royal Roads Military College in 1951.

Yanow joined the Navy after graduating from the University of Saskatchewan, and rose the ranks to become commanding officer of HMCS Saguenay in 1969 and HMCS Athabaskan in 1972.

He later became naval attaché in Washington, D.C., Commander of Maritime Forces Pacific and ended his career at the DND HQ in Ottawa.

References

1933 births
2017 deaths
People from Saskatoon
University of Saskatchewan alumni
Royal Canadian Navy officers
Canadian admirals
Canadian military personnel from Saskatchewan
Naval attachés